Robert Miguet (born 30 December 1929 in Toulouse, Haute-Garonne) is  a French civil servant.

He was a student of the Lycée Pierre-de-Fermat in Toulouse.

He is a graduate of Institut d’études politiques de Toulouse (IEP Toulouse).

Career
 1956-1958 (promotion 18 Juin) : École nationale d'administration (ENA)
 1961-1962 : sub-prefect of Inini, French Guiana
 Sub-prefect of Lisieux in Lisieux City
 Sub-prefect of Bastia in Bastia City
 Sub-prefect of Montbéliard in Montbéliard City 
 28 February 1982 to 10 May 1982 : prefect of Guadeloupe
 10 May 1982 to 13 February 1984 : commissioner of the Republic (name given to the prefects by the Socialist government at this time) of Guadeloupe
 1984 - 18 June 1986 : commissioner of the Republic of Pyrénées-Orientales, Languedoc-Roussillon in Perpignan
 18 June 1986 - 30 September 1987: commissioner of the Republic of Gard, Languedoc-Roussillon in Nîmes

Honours and awards
 Chevalier (Knight) (1984), puis officier of the Légion d’honneur (1995).
 Commandeur of the ordre national du Mérite

Works 
  Robert Miguet, Chroniques de la vie préfectorale, 1958-1994, Phénix éditions, 2002, 378 p., 
 No exemplary of this books in the Bibliothèque nationale de France (BNF) but an only exemplary in the Bibliothèque universitaire of the University of Antilles-Guyane.

References
  "Miguet, Robert, Félix" (prefect, born  1929), page 1460 in Who's Who in France : Dictionnaire biographique de personnalités françaises vivant en France, dans les territoires d’Outre-Mer ou à l’étranger et personnalités étrangères résidant en France, 37th edition for 2005-2006 (printed in 2005), 31 cm,  .

Notes

External links

See also 
 List of colonial and departmental heads of Guadeloupe

Living people
1929 births
People from Toulouse
Lycée Pierre-de-Fermat alumni
Sciences Po alumni
École nationale d'administration alumni
Prefects of France
Prefects of Guadeloupe
Prefects of Pyrénées-Orientales
Prefects of Gard
Officiers of the Légion d'honneur
Commanders of the Ordre national du Mérite